Glucan 1,4-α-glucosidase (EC 3.2.1.3, glucoamylase, amyloglucosidase', γ-amylase, lysosomal α-glucosidase, acid maltase, exo-1,4-α-glucosidase, glucose amylase, γ-1,4-glucan glucohydrolase, acid maltase, 1,4-α-D-glucan glucohydrolase) is an enzyme located on the brush border of the small intestine with systematic name 4-α-D-glucan glucohydrolase. It catalyses the following chemical reaction

 Hydrolysis of terminal (1→4)-linked α-D-glucose residues successively from non-reducing ends of the chains with release of β-D-glucose

Most forms of the enzyme can rapidly hydrolyse 1,6-α-D-glucosidic bonds when the next bond in the sequence is 1,4.  They belong to a variety of different GH families, such as glycoside hydrolase family 15 in fungi, glycoside hydrolase family 31 of human intestine MGAM, and glycoside hydrolase family 97 of bacterial forms. It was also known as γ-Amylase.

See also 
 Amylase

References

External links 
 

EC 3.2.1